Azimov (masculine) or Azimova (feminine) is a Russian last name. Variants of this last name include Ozimkov/Ozimkova (/) and Ozimov/Ozimova (/).

There are several theories about the origins of this last name. According to one, it is derived from the non-Christian names (or nicknames) Ozimko, Ozim, and Ozimy, which in dialects with akanye transformed into "Azim". These names/nicknames were given to babies born in late fall right before the beginning of winter. It is also possible that this last name derives from the Pskov and Tver dialectal word "" (ozim), meaning trembling, shivering, a chilly sensation in the body. Another possible origin is the Greek word for a bland cake consumed in religious contexts (most likely meaning that this last name was created artificially in a seminary environment). In his autobiography, Isaac Asimov states that his surname (a variant spelling of Azimov) comes from the first part of ozimyi khleb (озимый хлеб), meaning the winter grain (specifically rye) in which his great-great-great-grandfather dealt, with the Russian patronymic ending -ov added. Finally, the last name "Azimov" may be of Turkic origins, deriving from the Arabic name "Azim", which literally means great.

Notable people with the last name include:
Araz Azimov (born 1963), Azerbaijani politician
Aziza Azimova (1915-1997), Tajikistani ballet dancer and actress
Isaak Azimov, birth name of Isaac Asimov (1920–1992), American writer and professor
Rakhim Azimov (born 1964), Russian politician
Rustam Azimov (born 1958), Uzbek politician
Yahyo Azimov (born 1947), Tajik politician

See also
Asimov (surname), a related last name
Asimov (disambiguation)

References

Notes

Sources
И. М. Ганжина (I. M. Ganzhina). "Словарь современных русских фамилий" (Dictionary of Modern Russian Last Names). Москва, 2001. 
Ю. А. Федосюк (Yu. A. Fedosyuk). "Русские фамилии: популярный этимологический словарь" (Russian Last Names: a Popular Etymological Dictionary). Москва, 2006. 



Russian-language surnames